Marie Louise de La Tour d'Auvergne (Marie Louise Henriette Jeanne; 15 August 1725 – 1793) was a French noblewoman and member of the House of La Tour d'Auvergne. She was the Princess of Guéméné by marriage.

Biography

Marie Louise was the first child born to Charles Godefroy de La Tour d'Auvergne and his wife Maria Karolina Sobieska, granddaughter of John III Sobieski and an older sister of Clementina Sobieski, wife of James Francis Edward Stuart. She had a younger brother Godefroy Charles Henri who succeeded their father as Duke of Bouillon.

A great-granddaughter of John III Sobieski, she was also an exceptionally wealthy heiress. Because of the latter, Louis XV of France took a great personal interest in her marriage prospects.

Mademoiselle d'Auvergne was a proposed bride for Honoré III, Prince of Monaco. He was the son of the late Louise Hippolyte, Princess of Monaco, and her consort Jacques Goyon de Matignon. Even though marriage plans were announced to the court on 26 January 1741, at the end the marriage never materialised.

Eventually, she married Jules Hercule Mériadec de Rohan, Duke of Montbazon, Prince of Guéméné.

The couple married on 19 February 1743 in Paris when Marie Louise was not yet seventeen. Jules was the son of Hercule Mériadec de Rohan, Duke of Montbazon, Prince of Guéméné (1688–1757) and Louise Gabrielle Julie de Rohan (1704–1741). Marie Louise gave birth to her son, Henri Louis, two years later.

Through her mother, Marie Louise could count Holy Roman Empress and Electress of Saxony as her cousins. Her aunt, Anne Marie Louise de La Tour d'Auvergne, had already married into the House of Rohan, which ranked as foreign princes at the court of Versailles. As such, this gave them the style of Highness and the right to outrank certain other members of the court.

In November 1746, Marie Louise contracted smallpox, an often deadly disease. During Mary Louise's convalescence, her family received a sympathy note from her first cousin, Charles Edward Stuart, also known as "the Young Pretender." After recovering, in August 1747, Mary Louise met Stuart. She fell passionately in love with him and they began an affair.

Adultery was widely accepted in Marie Louise's circle so long as it was done discreetly. However, as neither Marie Louise nor her husband had been unfaithful before, her mother-in-law kept a very strict eye on her because her husband was with the French army in the Netherlands. Thus, servants had been ordered, by the mother-in-law, to guard Mary Louise's virtue. This led to secret midnight coach-rides with Stuart. However, the mother-in-law had knowledge of those as well. She alerted the Paris police, who reported what went on.

After a while, Marie Louise found herself pregnant and resorted to sleeping with her returned husband to make him believe he was the father. This enraged a jealous Stuart to create a scene.

Nevertheless, Marie Louise's husband did nothing as gossip spread. In January 1748, when confronted by her father and mother-in-law, Marie Louise was forced to write Stuart and end their affair. To refute any further gossip, Stuart was allowed to visit Mary Louise and her family.

In despair, Marie Louise continued to send letters to Stuart. She threatened suicide if he didn't come to see her. He did some three months later, again in a midnight assignation, but told Marie Louise he had a new mistress, Clementina Walkinshaw. Clementina later gave birth to Charlotte Stuart, Duchess of Albany, the only one of Stuart's children to survive infancy.

On 28 July 1748, Marie Louise gave birth to a son, who was baptised Charles Godefroi Sophie Jules Marie de Rohan. It was her mother-in-law who wrote to Charles's father, "the Old Pretender," in Rome to report the news, albeit not that the infant was his grandchild. Despite the boy being accepted as a member of the Rohan family, several genealogical books note that the Rohans fail to mention the child again. Allegedly, Charles Godefroi died around five months old, in either December 1748 or 18 January 1749.

Marie Louise lived at least another thirty-three years and apparently was never unfaithful again. To all appearances, she was a good wife and mother to her first-born son, Henri, but never had another child after the death of her second son. She made occasional appearances at court, then later in life became religious and devoted much of her time to charity.

When she died, Marie Louise was buried in the couvent des Feuillants together with her second child. However, there is uncertainty as to exactly when her death occurred -- either naturally in September 1781 or on the guillotine in 1793. The latter is widely accepted.

It is through Marie Louise that the present Princes of Guéméné are pretenders to the Duchy of Bouillon.

Issue

Henri Louis Marie de Rohan, Duke of Montbazon, Prince of Guéméné (31 August 1745 – 24 April 1809) married Victoire de Rohan and had issue; she was the sister of the Princess of Condé
Charles Godefroi Sophie Jules Marie de Rohan (28 July 1748 – December 1748) illegitimate child.

Ancestry

Fiction
Louise is a character in the 1992 Diana Gabaldon novel Dragonfly in Amber, and is portrayed by Claire Sermonne in season 2 of the television adaptation, Outlander.

References and notes

1725 births
1793 deaths
Nobility from Paris
Marie Louise
18th-century French nobility
18th-century French women
Marie Louise
Marie Louise
French people executed by guillotine during the French Revolution
Executed French women
People of Byzantine descent